Qualified teacher status (QTS) or Qualified Teacher Learning and Skills status (QTLS) is required in England and Wales to work as a teacher of children in state schools under local authority control, and in special education schools. A similar status exists under a different name in Scotland and Northern Ireland.

Gaining QTS or QTLS
An undergraduate degree and successful completion of a teacher training programme is compulsory for QTS recommendation. One of the main routes to achieving QTS, for those already in possession of a degree, involves undertaking a postgraduate teacher training course, such as the Postgraduate Certificate in Education or a School Direct programme. The Diploma in Education and Training leads to QTLS. There are also some undergraduate degree qualifications leading to QTS, such as the Bachelor of Education. In England only, candidates must also pass professional skills tests. All candidates must have GCSEs at grade C or above in English and mathematics, and prospective primary teachers must also be in possession of (usually) a grade C in a science subject before embarking on teacher training.

All training which leads to qualified teacher status requires trainees to train across at least two key consecutive pupil age ranges, as defined in the Secretary of State's Requirements for Initial Teacher Training. The age ranges are:

Ages 3–5    (Early years foundation stage)
Ages 5–7    (School years 1 and 2)	
Ages 7–9    (School years 3 and 4)
Ages 9–11   (School years 5 and 6)
Ages 11–14  (School years 7 to 9)	
Ages 14–16  (School years 10 and 11)
Ages 16–19  (School years 12 and 13)

The Teaching Regulation Agency in England and General Teaching Council for Wales maintain all registrations, as well as issuing QTS certificates.

QTS is technically recognised only in the country it was awarded (England or Wales), but teachers can normally apply for QTS in other home countries relatively easily. QTS is also recognised by many other countries once the relevant paperwork has been completed, though many countries place a lot of importance on the route to QTS (such as requiring a PGCE, whilst not accepting the GTP). Teachers trained outside England and Wales must also apply to be awarded QTS if they wish to teach in these countries.

After having been awarded QTS teachers must normally still pass an induction period (previously called 'probation') – normally their first year of teaching. Teachers who have gained QTS but have not yet completed the Induction period are known as NQTs. NQTs who fail the induction still retain their QTS, but cannot teach in state-run schools. The induction period normally lasts a year (three school terms).

Not all European Union qualifications have been officially recognised yet, so one should confirm with one's education establishment as to whether one's qualifications are acceptable, or whether one needs to go through the recognition process.

Routes to QTS or QTLS

Many different qualifications and courses lead to QTS or QTLS:

Postgraduate Certificate in Education (PGCE)

The PGCE is a one-year course for existing degree holders, and the most common postgraduate route into teaching. It is based at and coordinated by a university or other higher education institution, though students spend a large proportion of the course working in placement schools. The PGCE carries credits towards a master's degree.

Diploma in Education and Training (DET)
The DET is a Level 5 Diploma in Education and Training. It is a one-year 120 credit initial teacher training programme awarded by a university or an awarding body such as Learning Resource Network (LRN). DET graduates are eligible to apply for QTLS from Society for Education and Training.

School-Centred Initial Teacher Training (SCITT)

A SCITT programme enables graduates to undertake their training within a school environment, leading to QTS. Some SCITT programmes also award a PGCE qualification. It is available in England only.

Graduate Teacher Programme (GTP) 

The GTP enables candidates to gain QTS while they are employed as an unqualified teacher in a school.

Both the graduate and registered teacher programmes (GTP and RTP) have been closed in England. The graduate teacher programme (GTP) has been replaced by the School Direct Training Programme (salaried).

Undergraduate QTS routes
Students can take a three or four-year undergraduate degree course that includes QTS. This enables a candidate to gain their QTS while they study for their degree, with teaching practice being undertaken over the course of the whole programme. These are usually Bachelor of Education (BEd) degrees, though some are Bachelor of Arts (BA) and Bachelor of Science (BSc) degrees.

Scotland and Northern Ireland
QTS as such does not exist in Scotland or Northern Ireland. However, as is the case in England and Wales, all teachers in Scotland and Northern Ireland are required to register with either the General Teaching Council for Scotland or the General Teaching Council for Northern Ireland; the General Teaching Councils will consider only graduates with teaching qualifications (such as a BEd, PGCE or PGDE) for registration.

In Northern Ireland, a one-year Induction programme (equivalent to the NQT programme in England and Wales) must be completed.

In Scotland, a one-year probation period (equivalent to induction in England and Wales) must be completed.

Those holding English or Welsh QTS (or an equivalent from another country) must apply for registration with the relevant General Teaching Council. Each case is considered individually;  even those with English or Welsh QTS are not guaranteed to be allowed to teach in Scotland or Northern Ireland.

Schools not requiring QTS for teachers 

There is no formal requirement for teachers at independent schools or free schools to have QTS.

As of 27 July 2012, there is no longer any requirement for teaching staff in academies to have QTS.

See also
 Early Years Professional Status

References

External links
 Guidance on qualified teacher status
 General Teaching Council for England
 General Teaching Council for Wales
 General Teaching Council for Scotland
 General Teaching Council for Northern Ireland
 Diploma in Education and Training (DET)

Education in the United Kingdom
Professional certification in teaching
Teacher training